Hugh IX "le Brun" of Lusignan (1163/1168 – 5 November 1219) was the grandson of Hugh VIII. His father, also Hugh (b. c. 1141), was the co-seigneur of Lusignan from 1164, marrying a woman named Orengarde before 1162 or about 1167 and dying in 1169. Hugh IX became seigneur of Lusignan in 1172, seigneur of Couhé and Chateau-Larcher in the 1190s, and Count of La Marche (as Hugh IV) on his grandfather's death. Hugh IX died on the Fifth Crusade at the siege of Damietta on 5 November 1219.

Hugh IX is mentioned under the pseudonym Maracdes ("Emerald") in two poems by the troubadour Gaucelm Faidit, according to the Occitan razós to these poems.

Marriage and issue
His first wife was possibly Agathe de Preuilly, daughter of Peter (Pierre) II de Preuilly and Aenor de Mauleon. Their marriage was annulled in 1189. 
 Hugh X of Lusignan married Isabella of Angoulême
 Agathe of Lusignan, married c. 1220 Geoffroi V Seigneur de Pons

His second wife, married c. 1200, was Mathilde of Angoulême (1181 – 1233), daughter of Wulgrin III of Angoulême, Count of Angoulême.

Fictional portrayals
Hugh was portrayed by actor James Cossins in the 1978 BBC TV drama series The Devil's Crown.

Ancestry

See also
 County of La Marche
 Raoul I of Lusignan

Notes

Sources 

 
 
 

1160s births
1219 deaths
Year of birth uncertain
Lusignan, Hugh X de

Christians of the Third Crusade
Christians of the Fifth Crusade
House of Lusignan
12th-century French people
13th-century French people